Pamidipadu village is located in Korisapadu mandal of Prakasam district in Andhra Pradesh

References

Villages in Prakasam district